The Chicago Whales were a Major League Baseball franchise that played in the Federal League during its two years of existence, 1914 and 1915. The following is a list of players and who appeared in at least one game for the franchise during this time. This includes the Chicago Federals, the name of the club in 1914.

Keys

List of players

See also
Chicago Keeleys-minor league Federal League-players (1913)

References

External links
Baseball Reference

Major League Baseball all-time rosters